Kaid Ridavan was the military leader of the Hafsid dynasty during the siege of Malta.

Siege of Malta 

In September 1429, an army of about 18,000 Hafsid soldiers led by Kaid Ridavan landed on the Maltese coast. The invaders first attacked the capital city (at the time) of Mdina, and after three days of fighting, they left the city, looting the other towns and destroying the Augustinian monastery in Rabat.

Between 3,000 and 4.500 Maltese civilians were taken as prisoners and were enslaved while many were killed.

References 

Maltese military personnel
15th-century people of Ifriqiya